Alaena johanna, the Johanna's Zulu, is a butterfly in the family Lycaenidae. It is found in Ethiopia, Somalia, Kenya and Tanzania. The habitat consists of savanna and rocky hillsides at altitudes ranging from 1,200 to 1,900 metres.

The larvae probably feed on lichens.

Subspecies
Alaena johanna johanna (Ethiopia, Somalia, central Kenya, Tanzania)
Alaena johanna tsavoa Jackson, 1966 (eastern Kenya)

References

Butterflies described in 1890
Alaena
Butterflies of Africa